Love Is Elsewhere (愛情萬歲) is a 2008 Hong Kong romantic drama film. The film is based on an original story by Cheung Fan (張帆), edited by Yau Chi Wai (邱志偉) and directed by Vincent Chui (崔允信). The film had its world premiere at the 32nd Hong Kong International Film Festival in 2008.

Cast
Pakho Chau as Joe Yueng (楊溢德)
Ken Hung as Ah Sing (阿星)
Jason Chan as Ah Sung (阿生)
Sherman Chung as Yat-Ching Wong (黃日晴)
Yumiko Cheng as Sandra (阿如)
Chelsea Tong as Kelly
Charmaine Fong as Maggie
Patrick Tang as Ji-Ho Fong (方志豪)
Louis Cheung as Martin Hui (許少雄)

Guest appearance
Clarence Hui (許願) as Ah Sing's uncle

Featured songs
"Foolish Boy" (傻小子) - Pakho Chau from the album Continue
"Rare" (萬中無一) - Jason Chan from the album First Experience
"Love. Gutless" (愛. 無膽) - Ken Hung from the album  Love. Gutless

References

External links
 
 

Hong Kong romantic drama films
2000s Hong Kong films